"A Few Good Stories" is a song recorded by Canadian country artist Brett Kissel. The track was co-written by Ben Hayslip, Chris Stevens, and Rhett Akins. A second version of the track with Canadian indie pop band Walk off the Earth was released in November 2020.

Music video
The official music video for "A Few Good Stories" with Walk Off the Earth premiered on November 6, 2020, and was directed by Chris Di Staulo. The video features Kissel, members of Walk off the Earth, Edmonton Oilers star Connor McDavid, as well as Kissel's dog Charlie, McDavid's dog Lenny, and television personalities Kaitlyn Bristowe and Jason Tartick's dogs Ramen and Pinot.

Commercial performance
"A Few Good Stories" reached a peak of Number One on the Billboard Canada Country chart dated January 23, 2021. It marks Kissel's third Number One hit on the chart after "Airwaves" and "Drink About Me". It also peaked at number 62 on the Billboard Canadian Hot 100, and was certified Gold by Music Canada.

Charts

Certifications

References

2020 songs
2020 singles
Brett Kissel songs
Walk Off the Earth songs
Songs written by Rhett Akins
Songs written by Ben Hayslip
Warner Music Group singles
Songs written by Christopher Stevens (musician)